The Irish Traction Group is a railway preservation society dedicated to preserving diesel locomotives from Irish Railways. It was formed in 1989, with the intention of attempting to preserve at least one example of every type of diesel locomotive to have operated on Irish Rail.

History
The Irish Traction Group was founded on 4 June 1989 with the intentions to preserve one locomotive of each class of diesel locomotives to have been operated on the Irish railway system. However, they were unable to initially purchase any locomotives from Iarnród Éireann, who wanted the ITG to have a home for their locomotives before they would consider selling any locomotives to the group. Initially the group was offered the old Portarlington goods shed in December 1990, but were unable to procure the building when IE decided to redevelop the property in March 1991.

The group was later offered the old Carrick-on-Suir goods shed, which they had previously considered but decided against it due to its poor condition, removal of its siding, and its distance from Dublin. However, with few other sites available, the group reluctantly agreed to lease the shed in May 1992, with a one-year rent-free period for the shed to be rebuilt as a workshop. Subsequently, IE began the process of selling diesel locomotive C226 to the group; this was the first locomotive to arrive at Carrick-on-Suir on Sunday 6 December 1992 for restoration.

Locomotives
The ITG owns thirteen locomotives and has previously owned another three locomotives:

Locomotives currently owned by the ITG
001(A) class: A3R & A39R
101(B) class: B103
121(B) class: 124
141(B) class: 146 & 152
181(B) class: 190
201(C) class: 226 & C231
601(G) class: G601
611(G) class: G611, G616 & G617

Locomotives formerly owned by the ITG
NIR 1 Class: 1, 2 and 3. Purchased from NIR as their DH class in 1994, the ITG sold locomotives DH 2 and DH 3 to Beaver Power Ltd in 2005 for work in Sri Lanka, and were subsequently overhauled at Beaver's Merthyr Tydfil workshops, the work including regauging to 5' 6" and the fitting of a new diesel engine. In 2010, the ITG sold locomotive DH 1 to Beaver for eventual overhaul (it had been moved with DH 2 and DH 3 in 2005 for use initially as a source of spare parts) and reuse in Sri Lanka; today, DH 2 is operational at a Holcim cement plant in Puttalam province, Sri Lanka, while DH 1, stripped for parts during the rebuilding of the other two, remains stored at Merthyr Tydfil. After several years of operation, DH 3 has also been stripped for parts in Sri Lanka for the upkeep of DH 2.

Location
The ITG are based in the former Carrick-on-Suir goods shed in Carrick-on-Suir, County Tipperary. In addition to the Carrick on Suir goods shed, which serves as the group's main restoration base, some of its locos are located at Moyasta Junction on the preserved West Clare Railway, Co. Clare. Locomotives A39R, 146, 190, C231, G611 & G617 are on loan to the Downpatrick & County Down Railway, where they are used to haul regular heritage services.

Restoration
At present, the ITG have four locomotives at their Carrick-on-Suir site, mainline locomotives 226 and B103, and shunting locomotives G616 and G601. Present work is focused on restoring 226, while B103 and G601 are stored outside under protective steel covers. G616 is currently stored inside the shed in a partially dismantled state, the results of an overhaul started in 1993 but stopped in 1996 due to a lack of volunteers to continue work on the locomotive.
Work resumed on this locomotive in early 2012. The engine was started for the first time in some 26 years on Saturday 29 September 2012. 

At present four locomotives, A3R, 124, 152 and 190 are located in Moyasta. C231 was previously stored at Moyasta but has been moved to Downpatrick and County Down Railway; it has been restored to running order.
Locomotive 152 was undergoing repairs to its brake valves and cabs when it was sold to the ITG in 2010, and could be brought back to operating condition in the future if required. The other locomotives are all cosmetically in good order, but have all been in storage for long periods of time.

See also 
List of heritage railways in the Republic of Ireland
Diesel locomotives of Ireland
Railway Preservation Society of Ireland

References

Further reading

External links
Irish Traction Group home page

Heritage railways in the Republic of Ireland
Carrick-on-Suir